Thwaites & Reed has been in continuous manufacture since its foundation and claims to be the oldest clock manufacturing company in the world.  Geoffrey Buggins MBE, the last of the original family clockmakers, saw drawings of Thwaites clocks dating back to 1610. These drawings and other early records prior to 1780 went missing but other records from that date are stored with the London Metropolitan Archives.  Further records are stored by Thwaites & Reed up to present day. Dunstable Town Council archives had their Catalogue of Turret Clocks etc in booklet form made up to 1878 claiming upward of 4,000 church and turret clocks made in their factory since the establishment of the business, and there is a later incomplete list showing the date of supply and purchasers of turret clocks to 1902. The business of John Moore, a former apprentice, was acquired in 1899.  Up to 1900, 2978 domestic clocks were made with serial numbers in chronological order.  Other clocks were not listed, but from 1972 to 1980 ten types of replica clocks including the Benjamin Franklin Clock, Congreve Rolling Ball Clock, various skeleton clocks and the inclined Plane, Rack, Rising Works Drum Clocks, were made as limited editions.. For 30 years, it maintained all the clocks at the Palace of Westminster, including the Great Clock. Other than Thwaites & Reed, associated tradenames are Aynsworth Thwaites, John Thwaites, and was trade supplier of movements to many well known historic clockmakers including Dutton, Dwerrihouse, Ellicott and Vulliamy and in more recent times well known retailers including The Franklin Mint, Asprey and Garrards.  During its ownership by FW Elliott Ltd it also made movements under the Elliott brand.

History 
John Thwaites was a clockmaker at the beginning of the 17th century and from this extended family Aynsworth Thwaites founded the business about 1735 and is known to be in Rosoman Street, Clerkenwell, London in 1740, and continued there until 1780. Thereafter the firm traded from Bowling Green Lane and in the 18th and 19th centuries became the most prolific in England producing turret and domestic clocks of all descriptions including rare musical clocks and was the main supplier to the Turkish market (the Ottoman Empire) (Cite The Musical Clock Arthur WJG Ord-Hume). The company's earliest recorded commission and still in use, was a turret clock for Horseguards Parade made in 1740 but not finished until 1768, and a domestic long-clock about 1770 for the British East India Company.  The complexity of the Horseguards clock is the result of many previous years' clockmaking experience, but older work has not been identified. Aynsworth was succeeded by John Thwaites, who was head of the firm from 1780 to 1816, and master of the Clockmakers' Company in 1815, 1819, and 1820.  In 1816, Thwaites partnered with George Jeremiah Reed, and the firm became Thwaites & Reed. John Thwaites remained at the firm's head until 1842. In 1856 Thomas Buggins purchased the business from Henrietta Reed, the widow of George Jeremiah Reed, and the business remained in the Buggins family for four generations, the last being Geoffrey Thomas Edwin Buggins MBE.  The business held the royal warrant under two chairmen and the team of employees included two exceptionally talented clockmakers, John Vernon and Peter Haward. Many well-known clocks were built and. Fine examples are the Fortnum and Mason automaton, the Financial Times Astronomical clock, two reproductions of the historical Giovanni di Dondi clock by Peter Haward and restoration of the Hampton Court Clock and the rebuilding of Big Ben following a structural failure (1977) by John Vernon. Geoffrey Buggins realised that the business could not continue as it was, in the post war world.  Fortunately Simon Mackay (Lord Tanlaw) a keen horologist and FBHI took an interest and he became temporary owner and Chairman.  He financed the series of replica clocks (over 10,000 built in limited editions). Geoffrey Buggins continued to operate the business pending its transfer as a going concern to the National Enterprise Board (and in doing so ensured the entire business, its assets, employees and historic records were seamlessly moved from a historic family firm to a modern incorporated business which was eventually sold by the National Enterprise Board to F,W.Elliott Ltd. (1978)  Geoffrey Buggins resigned as a director and his family connections ceased. The Elliott family has since sold the business to the Lee family (1991) and the business continues to be manufacturers of turret and domestic clocks.

Clocks 

 Clock at Horseguards Parade (1756)
 Tower Clock at St. Michael's Church in Charleston, SC (1764)
 East India Company, India (1770)
 Lincoln Cathedral north west tower (1775)
 The Royal Clock in the Queen Victoria Building in Sydney, Australia.
 Coach house entrance to Old Courtyard, Farlington School, Broadbridge Heath, Horsham, West Sussex, still in use - (John Thwaites, Clerkenwell, 1805).

 Bracken House Clock with Zodiac Calendar and Churchill's face emblazoned on it (1955?) - Bracken House, former home of the Financial Times)
 Royal Small Arms Factory Clock Tower (c 1783)
 Clock at All Saints Church, Wokingham (1817)
Tower clock at the Evangelical Lutheran Church, Strand Street, Cape Town 1820 still in full working order
 St. John's Church, Parramatta, NSW, Australia - clock in north tower (1821)
 St John's Anglican Church, New Town, Tasmania, Australia (1818)
 Holy Trinity Old Church, Margate (1845)
 The first Clock of the Torre Malakoff, Recife, Pernambuco, Brazil (1854).
 St. George Tabernacle, St. George, Utah,
 Prince Albert Memorial Clocktower, Hastings - Gothic style (1864)
 Bow Bells at St Mary-le-Bow electric clock mechanism (1961)
 Fortnum & Mason of Piccadilly, with automata jacks of the founders, Fortnum & Mason in 19th Century costumes. (1964)
 Mast House Clock, Simon's Town Naval Base, South Africa (1816)
 Penitentiary Chapel, Campbell St Gaol, Hobart, Australia (1828)
Queen Victoria Building, Sydney Australia.
 St. Peter's Church, St George, Bermuda
 St. Luke's Anglican Church, Richmond Tasmania, installed in 1922 (originally installed in St David’s Church Hobart in 1828)
Aqua Horological Tintinnabulator, Victoria Centre, Nottingham, England (Installed in 1973)

See also
List of royal warrant holders of the British royal family

References

External links

1740 establishments in England
British companies established in 1740
Manufacturing companies established in 1740
Clock manufacturing companies of the United Kingdom
Companies based in East Sussex
British Royal Warrant holders